Events from the year 1905 in Russia.

Incumbents
 Monarch – Nicholas II
 Chairman of the Council of Ministers – Sergei Witte (starting November 6)

Events

 January 1 – The official opening of the Trans-Siberian Railway.
 January 2 – Russo-Japanese War: The Russian Army surrenders at Port Arthur in Qing dynasty China.
 January 22 (January 9 O.S.) – The Bloody Sunday massacre of demonstrators led by Russian Orthodox priest Georgy Gapon trigger the abortive Revolution of 1905.
 January 26
  (January 13 O.S.) Russian Revolution of 1905: The Imperial Russian Army fire on demonstrators in Riga, Governorate of Livonia, killing 73 and injuring 200 people.

 March 3 – Tsar Nicholas II of Russia agrees to create the Duma.
 March 5 – Russo-Japanese War: Russian troops begin to retreat from Mukden after casualties of 100,000 troops in 3 days.
 May 27 – 28 – Russo-Japanese War – Battle of Tsushima: The Japanese fleet under Admiral Heihachiro Togo defeat the Russian fleet under Admiral Zinovi Petrovich Rozhdestvenski in a 2-day battle.
 June 27 – (June 14 according to the Julian calendar): Mutiny breaks out on the Russian ironclad Potemkin.
 September 5 – Russo-Japanese War – Treaty of Portsmouth: In New Hampshire, a treaty mediated by U.S. President Theodore Roosevelt is signed by Japan and Russia. Russia cedes the island of Sakhalin and port and rail rights in Manchuria to Japan.
 October 29
 (October 16 Old Style) Russian Revolution of 1905: The Imperial Russian Army opens fire on a meeting at a street market in Tallinn, Governorate of Estonia, killing 94 and injuring about 200 people.
 October 30 (October 17 Old Style) – October Manifesto: Tsar Nicholas II of Russia is forced to announce the granting of the Russian Constitution of 1906, conceding the State Duma.
 November 4 – The application of the February Manifesto, removing the veto of the Diet of the autonomous Grand Principality of Finland, is interrupted by the November Manifesto. The Senate of Finland is ordered to put forward a proposal for parliamentary reform based on unicameralism and universal and equal suffrage.
 November–December – Russian Revolution of 1905: Workers and peasants burn and loot hundreds of Baltic German manors in the Baltic governorates. The punitive Imperial Russian Army executes and deports thousands.

Births
January 2 – Lev Schnirelmann, mathematician and academic (d. 1938)

References

1905 in Russia
 Years of the 20th century in the Russian Empire